Tatjana Vorobjova (born 26 July 1996 in Tallinn) is a retired Estonian tennis player.

Playing for Estonia at the Fed Cup, Vorobjova has a win–loss record of 4–7.

Fed Cup participation

Singles

Doubles

References

External links 
 
 
 

1996 births
Living people
Sportspeople from Tallinn
Estonian female tennis players
Estonian people of Russian descent